Chris Gruetzemacher (born June 16, 1986) is an American mixed martial artist currently competing in the Lightweight division of the Ultimate Fighting Championship (UFC). A professional competitor since 2008, he has also competed for Strikeforce, the World Series of Fighting, and was a competitor on The Ultimate Fighter: Team McGregor vs. Team Faber.

Background
Gruetzemacher was born in Page, Arizona, United States, and at the age of five, his father (Army veteran Jim Gruetzemacher), was shot and murdered in Arizona, this evoked his primal instinct for self-protection where he started wrestling.

Gruetzemacher was a former student at Thunderbird High School where he started his wrestler training. He started training BJJ and Muay Thai in 2007 to get in shape and slowly progressing to compete in MMA.  He chose his professional as a fighter after decided to invest his time as an athlete in combat sport and to be part of something great in his life. He worked with the former Thailand national fight team member and multiple Muay Thai world champion, Master Kru Paul, in North Carolina to sharpen his stand up game prior finding his new training base at 2 Knuckle Sports.

A typical training day for Gruetzemacher involves strength and conditioning in the morning, grappling in the evening and works on this stand up game in the later of the day after teaches two BJJ classes at 2 Knuckle Sports MMA Academy.

Mixed martial arts career

Early career
Gruetzemacher started his professional debut in 2008 and fought most of his fights in Arizona, United States. He was the former fighter for Strikeforce and World Series of Fighting (WSOF). He amassed a record of 12–1 with 11 winning streak where he won back to back wins over UFC veterans Roli Delgado (who was 9 inches taller than Gruetzemacher) and John Gunderson prior signed by UFC.

Gruetzemacher took 21 months hiatus from his torn ACL injury before he stepped back to cage where he was selected as one of the contestants for UFC The Ultimate fighter 22.

The Ultimate Fighter
Gruetzemacher was selected to be one of the contestants for the UFC TV MMA competition series The Ultimate Fighter: Team McGregor vs. Team Faber, (The Ultimate Fighter 22), fighters from Europe coached under Conor McGregor vs fighters from United States coached under Urijah Faber. Gruetzemacher was coached under team Urijah Faber.

He faced Austin Springer on the Elimination fight and won the fight via TKO on round two. On the Opening Round he was up against Sascha Sharma and won the fight via unanimous decision. He moved on to the Quarterfinals and faced Artem Lobov and suffered a defeat via TKO.

In The Ultimate Fighter 22 episode 7 Gruetzemacher had a verbal confrontation after a heavy drinking session, betting shots on the billiard games, in the house between Gruetzemacher and Julian Erosa where Erosa commented Gruetzemacher's fights were the most boring in the house. The confrontation escalated and got more heated where Erosa challenged Gruetzemacher to act on his aggregation. Gruetzemacher splashes beer and water in Erosa's face. The confrontation eventually scaled down after some posturing and yelling and cooler heads prevailed with no physical fight was committed.

Ultimate Fighting Championship

Gruetzemacher made his promotional debut on December 11, 2015 at The Ultimate Fighter: Team McGregor vs. Team Faber Finale in Las Vegas, United States, against Abner Lloveras. He won the fight via unanimous decision.

He next faced Chas Skelly at UFC Fight Night: Bermudez vs. Korean Zombie on February 4, 2017. He lost the fight via submission on round two.

Gruetzemacher was expected to face Martin Bravo on August 5, 2017 at UFC Fight Night: Pettis vs. Moreno. He was pulled from the fight and replaced by Humberto Bandenay.

Gruetzemacher faced Davi Ramos on December 9, 2017 at UFC Fight Night 123. He lost the fight via submission in the third round.

Gruetzemacher faced Joe Lauzon on April 7, 2018 at UFC 223. He won the fight after Lauzon's corner stopped the fight after the second round. This win earned him a Performance of the Night bonus.

Gruetzemacher was expected to face Beneil Dariush on November 10, 2018 at UFC Fight Night 139.  However, on October 18, 2018, it was reported that Gruetzemacher withdrew from the event and was replaced by newcomer Thiago Moises.

Gruetzemacher was expected to face Jesus Pinedo on March 23, 2019 at UFC Fight Night 148. However, on March 13, 2019, it was reported that Gruetzemacher was pulled from the bout due to injury and was replaced by John Makdessi.

Gruetzemacher faced Alexander Hernandez on October 31, 2020 at UFC Fight Night 181. He lost the fight via knockout in the first round.

Gruetzemacher faced Rafa García on July 31, 2021 at UFC on ESPN 28. He won the fight via unanimous decision.

Gruetzemacher faced Claudio Puelles on December 4, 2021 at UFC on ESPN 31. He lost the fight via a kneebar in round three.

Championships and accomplishments
 Ultimate Fighting Championship
 Performance of the Night (One time)  vs. Joe Lauzon

Personal life
Former UFC and WEC fighter and current Bellator fighter, Benson Henderson and Gruetzemacher are teammates, and they are longtime training partners.

Since most of his teammates and teachers could not pronounce his last name "Gruetzemacher" correctly (pronounced : Gritz-mock-er) when he was young, they just called him "Gritz" (which is how the beginning of this last name is pronounced) and this is how his nickname 'Gritz" was coined.

Gruetzemacher cut his signature "caveman" long hair and donated it to Wigs for Kids, a charity for children who suffer from cancer, in 2017.

Mixed martial arts record

|-
|Loss
|align=center|15–5
|Claudio Puelles
|Submission (kneebar)
|UFC on ESPN: Font vs. Aldo
|
|align=center|3
|align=center|3:25
|Las Vegas, Nevada, United States
| 
|-
|Win
|align=center|15–4
|Rafa García
|Decision (unanimous)
|UFC on ESPN: Hall vs. Strickland
|
|align=center|3
|align=center|5:00
|Las Vegas, Nevada, United States
|
|-
|Loss
|align=center|14–4
|Alexander Hernandez
|KO (punches)
|UFC Fight Night: Hall vs. Silva
|
|align=center|1
|align=center|1:46
|Las Vegas, Nevada, United States
|
|-
|Win
|align=center|14–3
|Joe Lauzon
|TKO (corner stoppage)
|UFC 223
|
|align=center|2
|align=center|5:00
|Brooklyn, New York, United States
|
|-
|Loss
| align=center| 13–3
| Davi Ramos
| Submission (rear-naked choke)
| UFC Fight Night: Swanson vs. Ortega
| 
| align=center|3
| align=center|0:50
| Fresno, California, United States
|
|-
| Loss
| align=center| 13–2
| Chas Skelly
| Submission (rear-naked choke)
|UFC Fight Night: Bermudez vs. Korean Zombie
| 
| align=center|2
| align=center| 2:01
| Houston, Texas, United States
|
|-
| Win
| align=center| 13–1
| Abner Lloveras
| Decision (unanimous)
| The Ultimate Fighter: Team McGregor vs. Team Faber Finale
| 
| align=center|3
| align=center|5:00
|Las Vegas, Nevada, United States
|
|-
| Win
| align=center| 12–1
| John Gunderson
| Decision (unanimous)
| WSOF 9
| 
| align=center|3
| align=center| 5:00
| Las Vegas, Nevada, United States
|
|-
| Win
| align=center| 11–1
| Roli Delgado
| TKO (elbows)
| ShoFight 20
| 
| align=center|3
| align=center| 3:24
| Springfield, Missouri, United States
|
|-
| Win
| align=center| 10–1
| Frank Gomez
| TKO (punches)
| WMMA 1
| 
| align=center|1
| align=center| 3:25
| El Paso, Texas, United States
|
|-
| Win
| align=center| 9–1
| Randy Campbell
| KO (punch)
| Duel for Domination: MMA Extravaganza
| 
| align=center|1
| align=center| 1:07
| Phoenix, Arizona, United States
|
|-
| Win
| align=center| 8–1
| Jeff Fletcher
| TKO (punches)
| Rage in the Cage 153
| 
| align=center|2
| align=center| 2:41
| Chandler, Arizona, United States
|
|-
| Win
| align=center| 7–1
| Gabe Rivas
| Submission (armbar)
| Rage in the Cage 152
| 
| align=center|1
| align=center| 2:25
| Chandler, Arizona, United States
|
|-
| Win
| align=center| 6–1
|  Ryan Diaz
| TKO (doctor stoppage)
|Strikeforce Challengers: Riggs vs. Taylor
| 
| align=center|1
| align=center| N/A
| Phoenix, Arizona, United States
|
|-
| Win
| align=center| 5–1
| Nadeem Al-Hassan
| TKO (punches)
| Rage in the Cage 140
| 
| align=center|1
| align=center| 2:51
| Tucson, Arizona, United States
|
|-
| Win
| align=center| 4–1
| Eric Regan
| Decision (unanimous)
| Rage in the Cage 139
| 
| align=center|3
| align=center| 3:00
| Tucson, Arizona, United States
|
|-
| Win
| align=center| 3–1
| Oscar Rodriguez
| Submission (armbar)
| World Fighting Federation 1
| 
| align=center|1
| align=center| 1:45
| Tucson, Arizona, United States
|
|-
| Win
| align=center| 2–1
| Josh Gaskins
| Decision (split)
| AG: Extreme Beat Down
| 
| align=center|3
| align=center| 5:00
| Phoenix, Arizona, United States
|
|-
| Loss
| align=center| 1–1
| Joe Cronin
| Submission (guillotine choke)
| Rage in the Cage 122
| 
| align=center|1
| align=center|0:25
| Phoenix, Arizona, United States
|
|-
| Win
| align=center| 1–0
| Shawn Scott
| Submission (armbar)
| Evolution MMA
| 
| align=center|3
| align=center| 1:42
| Phoenix, Arizona, United States
|
|-

See also
 List of current UFC fighters
 List of male mixed martial artists

References

External links
 
 

1986 births
Living people
American male mixed martial artists
Featherweight mixed martial artists
Mixed martial artists utilizing Muay Thai
Mixed martial artists utilizing wrestling
Mixed martial artists utilizing Brazilian jiu-jitsu
American Muay Thai practitioners
American practitioners of Brazilian jiu-jitsu
People from Page, Arizona
Mixed martial artists from Arizona
Ultimate Fighting Championship male fighters